Caranbirini Conservation Reserve is a protected area in the Northern Territory of Australia.

The reserve can be accessed from the Carpentaria Highway.

The reserve contains a large number of habitats within a small area. Sandstone hills and ridges overlook woodlands and riverine vegetation surround a semi-permanent waterhole.

See also
 Protected areas of the Northern Territory

References

Conservation reserves in the Northern Territory
1996 establishments in Australia